The Vinsonhaler Blacksmith Shop is a historic commercial and industrial building located in Nyssa, Oregon, United States.

The blacksmith shop was added to the National Register of Historic Places in 1996.

See also
National Register of Historic Places listings in Malheur County, Oregon

References

External links

, National Register of Historic Places cover documentation

20th-century architecture in the United States
Blacksmith shops
Buildings and structures in Malheur County, Oregon
National Register of Historic Places in Malheur County, Oregon
Nyssa, Oregon
Vernacular architecture in Oregon